Nooitgedacht is a wooden octagonal windmill in Zeeuwse Arnemuiden in the Dutch municipality of Middelburg. The windmill was built in 1981 as a replacement for a windmill was built in 1736 but burned down in 1977.

References

 Molendatabase
 De Hollandsche Molen

Windmills in Zeeland
Rijksmonuments in Middelburg, Zeeland